Andre Begemann and Robin Haase were the defending champions, but Begemann chose not to participate this year. Haase played alongside Mikhail Youzhny, but lost in the first round to Oliver Marach and Aisam-ul-Haq Qureshi.
Aliaksandr Bury and Denis Istomin won the title, defeating Marach and Qureshi in the final, 3–6, 6–2, [10–5].

Seeds

Draw

Draw

References
 Main Draw

Swiss Open Gstaad - Doubles
2015 Doubles